was a Japanese volleyball player who competed in the 1964 Summer Olympics and in the 1972 Summer Olympics. He was born in Hyōgo Prefecture.

In 1964, he was a squad member of the Japanese team which won the bronze medal in the Olympic tournament. Eight years later, in 1972, he won the gold medal with the Japanese team in the 1972 Olympic tournament. He played five matches.

External links
 Yūzō Nakamura's profile at Sports Reference.com

1942 births
2010 deaths
Japanese men's volleyball players
Olympic volleyball players of Japan
Volleyball players at the 1964 Summer Olympics
Volleyball players at the 1972 Summer Olympics
Olympic gold medalists for Japan
Olympic bronze medalists for Japan
Olympic medalists in volleyball
Asian Games medalists in volleyball
Volleyball players at the 1966 Asian Games
Volleyball players at the 1970 Asian Games
Volleyball players at the 1974 Asian Games
Medalists at the 1966 Asian Games
Medalists at the 1970 Asian Games
Medalists at the 1974 Asian Games
Asian Games gold medalists for Japan
Medalists at the 1972 Summer Olympics
Medalists at the 1964 Summer Olympics
20th-century Japanese people